The 12281 / 12282 Bhubaneswar Duronto Express is a once-a-week weekly train which runs between Bhubaneswar, capital of Odisha and New Delhi in Delhi . This train was introduced as part of the Duronto Express trains that were announced by the then railways minister Mamata Banerjee in 2010-2011 rail budget. It is operated by East Coast Railway.

This train consists of total 17 no. of bogies out of which there are 4 no. of sleepers (S1-S8), 2 first class AC coach (H1), eight 2-tier AC coach (A1), five  3-tier AC coaches (B1-B4), one pantry car and 2 no.s of SLR bogies each at both the ends. It uses LHB coach.

It has Rake sharing with 22806/05 Anand Vihar Terminal Bhubaneswar Weekly Superfast Express.

Time Table

12281 train starts from Bhubaneswar (BBS) every Wednesday at 08:00 AM and reach to New Delhi (NDLS) at 06:25 AM next day.

12282 train starts from New Delhi (NDLS) every Thursday at 12:55 PM and reach back to Bhubaneswar (BBS) at 10:45 AM next day.

Stoppages 
It's halts are,

 Balasore
 Adra
 Pt. Deen Dayal Upadhyay Jn.
 Kanpur Central

Loco Link 
Bhubaneswar - New Delhi Duronto Express is hauled by a Ghaziabad-based WAP 7 locomotive on its entire journey.

Gallery

See also

 Types of Passenger Services
 Types of Accommodation
 East Coast Railway Zone

References

External links
East Coast Railway Official Website
East Coast Railway Discussions Board
Waltair Division Official Website

Transport in Delhi
Transport in Bhubaneswar
Duronto Express trains
Rail transport in Odisha
Rail transport in West Bengal
Rail transport in Uttar Pradesh
Rail transport in Delhi
Railway services introduced in 2010